Ukigumo is Japanese for drifting or floating cloud(s) and may refer to:

 Ukigumo (novel)  Drifting Clouds, 1887 novel by Futabatei Shimei
 Ukigumo (novel) a.k.a. Floating Clouds, 1951 novel by Fumiko Hayashi
 Ukigumo (film) a.k.a. Floating Clouds, 1955 film, based on Hayashi's novel, by Mikio Naruse
 Ukigumo (musician) (born 1978), Japanese guitarist and songwriter